The British two pound (£2) coin is a denomination of sterling coinage. Its obverse has featured the profile of Queen Elizabeth II since the coin’s introduction. Three different portraits of the Queen have been used, with the current design by Jody Clark being introduced in 2015. The reverse design features Britannia.

The coin was introduced on 15 June 1998 (coins minted 1997) after a review of the United Kingdom's coinage decided that a general-circulation £2 coin was needed. The new bi-metallic coin design replaced a series of commemorative, uni-metallic coins which were issued between 1986 and 1996 to celebrate special occasions. Although legal tender, those earlier coins had never been common in everyday circulation.

As of March 2014 there were an estimated 417 million £2 coins in circulation with an estimated face value of £834 million.

Beyond the usual commemorative versions, no standard two pound coins have been minted for general circulation since 2016, although examples have been issued in uncirculated sets at a premium. This was because the concurrent introduction of the new version of the one pound coin had put enough £2 (and 20 pence) coins back into circulation, as people emptied coin jars primarily for the older one pound coin that was due to be withdrawn.

£2 coins are legal tender to any amount when offered in repayment of a debt; however, the coin's legal tender status is not normally relevant for everyday transactions.

Design

The original reverse of the coin, designed by Bruce Rushin, is an abstract design symbolising the history of technological achievement, accompanied by the words TWO POUNDS above, and the year of minting below.
This was the first bi-metallic coin to be produced for circulation in Britain since the tin farthing with a copper plug produced in 1692, and is the highest denomination coin in common circulation in the UK. The coin consists of an outer yellow metal nickel-brass ring made from 76% copper, 20% zinc, and 4% nickel, and an inner steel-coloured cupro-nickel disc made from 75% copper, 25% nickel.

The design itself was first tried out in 1994 when the Royal Mint produced a short run of demonstration pieces to the new bi-metal standard. These pieces were not for circulation and were simply intended to test the manufacturing process. The coin was technically similar to the version which eventually entered circulation with the Maklouf effigy of Queen Elizabeth II on the obverse and the image of a sailing ship similar to that previously used on the reverse of the pre-decimal halfpenny piece. The inscription on the reverse read ROYAL MINT TRIAL 1994 with an edge inscription based on the one pound coin which read DECUS ET TUTAMEN ANNO REGNI XLVI, meaning "An ornament and a safeguard – [in the] 46th year of [her] reign". The 1994 pieces were never legal tender but were eventually released for sale as part of a presentation set in 1998. At the same time in 1994 the Royal Mint produced a mono-metallic trial two-pound coin, with the same ship reverse and inscription, but otherwise similar to the earlier commemorative coins. These were never issued in presentation sets, and so are much scarcer than the bi-metallic version.

Because of technical difficulties, the 1997-dated coins, which bear the effigy of Queen Elizabeth II by Raphael Maklouf, were not released to circulation until June 1998 (the same time as the 1998-dated coins). 1998 and later dated coins bear the effigy of the Queen by Ian Rank-Broadley. The Maklouf-effigy coins bear the inscription ELIZABETH II DEI GRATIA REGINA F D on the obverse; the Rank-Broadley coins bear the inscription ELIZABETH II DEI GRA REG FID DEF.

The reverse of the regular-issue coin, designed by Bruce Rushin, bears a concentric design symbolically representing technological development from the Iron Age, through the Industrial Revolution and the Electronic Age to the Internet, with the inscription TWO POUNDS above the design and the date below. An oddity of the design is that it depicts nineteen interlocking gears. Because there is an odd number of them, the mechanism could not actually turn. The coin has the edge inscription STANDING ON THE SHOULDERS OF GIANTS, a quote taken from a letter by Isaac Newton to Robert Hooke, in which he describes how his work was built on the knowledge of those that had gone before him. "If I have seen further, it is by standing on the shoulders of giants." Newton was Warden and later Master of the Royal Mint.

In February 2015, the Royal Mint announced a new design featuring Britannia by Antony Dufort replacing the previous design. The new coins feature the edge inscription QUATUOR MARIA VINDICO, meaning "I claim the four seas", an inscription previously featured on coins bearing the image of Britannia.

The comparative rarity of the Maklouf-effigy coins has led to an urban myth that they are much more valuable than the other coins, but this is not true – there were over 13 million 1997-dated £2 coins issued. Another urban myth about the coin is that putting it in the freezer overnight causes the cupro-nickel centre to pop out, a claim which had been true of some early mintings of the similarly bimetallic Canadian 2 dollar coin.

Variants

In addition to the standard designs there have been several variant reverse designs used on the £2 coin to commemorate important events. These are summarised in the table below.

"Inverted effigy" coins 
In 2015, a small number of £2 Coins entered circulation that featured the Queen’s head rotated clockwise by approximately 150 degrees. The Royal Mint stated that the misalignment of the Queen’s effigy was "almost certainly the result of one of the dies working loose and rotating during the striking process". Change Checker, a coin dealing website, suggest that the Inverted Effigy may have affected as few as around just 3,250 coins.

Status as legal tender 
Current £2 coins are legal tender to any amount. However, "legal tender" has a very specific and narrow meaning which relates only to the repayment of debt to a creditor, not to everyday shopping or other transactions. Specifically, coins of particular denominations are said to be "legal tender" when a creditor must by law accept them in redemption of a debt. The term does not mean - as is often thought - that a shopkeeper has to accept a particular type of currency in payment. A shopkeeper is under no obligation to accept any specific type of payment, whether legal tender or not; conversely they have the discretion to accept any payment type they wish.

Mintages

See also

 Coins of the pound sterling
 Double sovereign
 Banknotes of the pound sterling

Notes

References

External links
 Royal Mint – £2 coin
 Coins of the UK – Decimal £2 Coins
 The Pemember 'error' on the £2 Gunpowder Plot commemorative
 Two Pounds, Coin Type from United Kingdom - Online Coin Club

Coins of the United Kingdom
Bi-metallic coins
Two-base-unit coins